Khirane  is a town and commune in Khenchela Province, Algeria. According to the 1998 census, it has a population of 5,350.

References

Communes of Khenchela Province